Michael Dennis Liut (born January 7, 1956) is a Canadian former professional ice hockey goaltender.

Liut played for the Cincinnati Stingers of the World Hockey Association (WHA) from 1977 to 1979 and for the St. Louis Blues, Hartford Whalers, and Washington Capitals of the National Hockey League (NHL) from 1979 to 1992. He won the 1981 Lester B. Pearson Award for being the most valuable player according to his fellow players, and posted the league's best goals against average in 1989–90.

College and WHA career 
Liut played college hockey at Bowling Green State University. After being named twice to the CCHA First All-Star team, the St. Louis Blues selected him 56th overall in 1976. However, he opted instead to play for the Cincinnati Stingers of the WHA for two seasons.  When the WHA merged with the NHL in 1979, the Blues reclaimed Liut's rights.

NHL career
With four seasons of College hockey and two seasons of pro hockey in the World Hockey Association under his belt, Mike Liut arrived in St. Louis - and the National Hockey League - ready to step in and contribute.  He immediately took over the starting duties for the Blues and made a major impact playing 64 games and posting a record of 32-23-9.  His second season saw him improve and become arguably the top goaltender in the league posting a record of 33-14-13.  He was voted a runner-up to Wayne Gretzky for the Hart Memorial Trophy for his efforts and was selected as a First Team All-Star and won the Lester B. Pearson Trophy as the league's MVP as determined by his peers.  That fall, he was Canada's starting goaltender at the 1981 Canada Cup, which ended with an 8–1 loss to the Soviet Union in the final.  Though he was not solely to blame, Liut's reputation as a top tier goaltender would never fully recover from the thrashing he took in that game and he would not represent Canada again in subsequent Canada Cup tournaments.

During his sixth season with the Blues, Liut was traded to the Hartford Whalers in exchange for net minder Greg Millen and forward Mark Johnson.  The timing of the deal was a little odd because the Blues were in first place in the Norris Division at the time of the transaction but the reason behind the swap appeared to be money.  The Blues, one of the most budget conscious teams in the league, moved out Liut and his reported $900,000 salary (tops on the team) and brought in two players whose combined salaries were less than they were paying Liut.  This was not lost on Liut, who said, "I'm sure (Blues owner Harry Ornest) has been promoting a trade of some sort because of my salary."

With the Whalers, Liut provided a steadying influence and in his second season with the club, he led the NHL in shutouts with four. In that same season, Liut backstopped the Whalers into the Adams Division finals, where they were defeated by the Montreal Canadiens in overtime of the seventh game in a memorable playoff series. The Canadiens went on to win the Stanley Cup that year. In 1986–87, Liut led the Whalers to their first and only Adams Division title and was named to the NHL's Second All-Star Team. He also posted the league's best goals-against average, with the Whalers, in 1989–90.

He was traded to the Washington Capitals late in the  1989-1990 campaign and left Hartford holding fourteen franchise goaltending records and sharing six other records.  With the Capitals, Liut joined another veteran, Don Beaupre, in handling the goaltending duties and his acquisition proved important in the post season when Beaupre was felled by an injury pressing Liut into service versus the New York Rangers.  Liut won three straight games, including the last two in overtime to send the Capitals to their first ever Semi-Final berth to face the Boston Bruins where they were swept out of the playoffs.  His heroics versus the Rangers  would prove to be his last hurrah.  He spent two more seasons with the Capitals but had difficulty maintaining his workhorse status because of a failing back, an ailment that led to his retirement in 1991–92. Liut was the last active WHA goalie in the NHL upon his retirement.

Following his playing career, Liut joined the University of Michigan as an assistant coach in 1995 until the end of the 1997–98 season.  He received a law degree in 1995, and now heads the ice hockey division at global sports management leader Octagon.

Liut is a second cousin of former NHL player Ron Francis (who was also his teammate on the Whalers). Liut was amongst a handful of goaltenders to sport a plain white mask throughout his NHL career, opting not to use customized artwork on his mask.

Career Achievements
Ted Lindsay Award (Formerly Lester B Pearson) voted MVP by the NHLPA in 1980-81 season.
1st Team All-Star (1980–81)
2nd Team All-Star (1986–87)
Goals Against Average leader (2.53) in 1989-90 season.
NHL All Star Game selection (1981)
Led NHL in Shutouts in (1986–87) and (1989–90) seasons.
Won "Silver" in 1981 World/Canada Cup as starting Goalie for Team Canada.
Led NHL in “games played" and "Minutes" in (1981–82) and (1982–83) seasons.
Most wins (239) by a goalie in the decade of the 1980s
Most shutouts (22) by a goalie in the decade of the 1980s
Most games played (544) by a goalie in the decade of the 1980s
Most minutes (31,597) by a goalie in the decade of the 1980s

Career statistics

Regular season and playoffs

International

Awards and honours
CCHA 

NHL

References

External links
 
 Profile at hockeydraftcentral.com

1956 births
Living people
Bowling Green Falcons men's ice hockey players
Bowling Green State University alumni
Canadian ice hockey goaltenders
Canadian sports agents
Cincinnati Stingers players
Hartford Whalers players
Lester B. Pearson Award winners
National Hockey League broadcasters
New England Whalers draft picks
St. Louis Blues draft picks
St. Louis Blues players
Ice hockey people from Toronto
Washington Capitals players